St. Matthew's Episcopal Church may refer to:

In the United States (ordered by state and city)

St. Matthew's Episcopal Church (National City, California), listed on the National Register of Historic Places in San Diego County, California
St. Matthew's Episcopal Church (Waimanalo, Hawaii), an Episcopal church in Waimanalo, Hawaii on the island of Oahu
St. Matthew's by the Bridge Episcopal Church, listed on the National Register of Historic Places in Hardin County, Iowa
St. Matthew's Episcopal Church (Houma, Louisiana), listed on the National Register of Historic Places in Terrebonne Parish, Louisiana
St. Matthew's Episcopal Church (Hallowell, Maine), an Episcopal church in Hallowell, Maine
St. Matthew's Episcopal Church (Worcester, Massachusetts), an Episcopal church in Worcester, Massachusetts
St. Matthew's Episcopal Church, Moravia, New York, NRHP-listed in Church Street–Congress Street Historic District
St. Matthew's Episcopal Church (Woodhaven, New York), listed on the National Register of Historic Places in Queens County, New York
St. Matthew's Episcopal Church and Churchyard, Hillsborough, North Carolina, listed on the National Register of Historic Places in Orange County, North Carolina
St. Matthew's Episcopal Church (Barrington, Rhode Island), listed on the National Register of Historic Places in Bristol County, Rhode Island
St. Matthew's Episcopal Church (Covington, Tennessee), listed on the National Register of Historic Places in Tipton County, Tennessee
St. Matthew's Episcopal Church (Charleston, West Virginia)
St. Matthew's Episcopal Church (Kenosha, Wisconsin), listed on the National Register of Historic Places in Kenosha County, Wisconsin

See also
St. Matthias Episcopal Church (disambiguation)